The Oriental stork (Ciconia boyciana; Japanese: コウノトリ Konotori) is a large, white bird with black wing feathers in the stork family Ciconiidae.

Taxonomy
The species was first described by Robert Swinhoe in 1873. It is closely related to and resembles the European white stork (C. ciconia), of which it was formerly often treated as a subspecies.

Description
Unlike its more widespread cousin, the Oriental stork has red skin around its eye, with a whitish iris and black bill. Both sexes are similar. The female is slightly smaller than male. The young are white with orange bills.

Distribution and habitat
The Oriental stork is  found in Japan, Manchuria, Korea and Siberia. It was once extirpated from Japan and the Korean Peninsula. However, in May 2007 a hatchling was reported in Japan for the first time in 40 years in the wild. It was an offspring of two storks who were bred in captivity.

Conservation
Due to habitat loss and overhunting, the Oriental stork is classified as endangered on the IUCN Red List of Threatened Species. It is listed on Appendix I of CITES.
There have been efforts to reintroduce the storks to the wild, but there must be changes to the environment first. The storks were harshly impacted by the growth of the rice industry and the subsequent use of pesticides. There is a push for rice farmers to grow their plants organically so that the storks may breed and grow safely in their environments.

Diet and behaviour
The Oriental stork is a solitary bird except during the breeding season. It likes to wade in marshes, pond's edges, coastal beaches, and other wetlands. These birds are apex predator in their habitat. Its diet consists mainly of fish, frog, insects, small birds and reptiles, as well as rodents.

Breeding
The female usually lays between two and six eggs.  After breeding, the storks migrate to eastern China in September and return in March.

See also
List of Special Places of Scenic Beauty, Special Historic Sites and Special Natural Monuments

References

External links 

 ARKive - Images and movies of the Oriental stork (Ciconia boyciana)
 BirdLife Species Factsheet
 Red Data Book
 BBC News bulletin about the birth of a chick in Japan
 The CBCGDF CCA for Oriental Stork at Tianjin Established, Guarding Migratory Birds’ Migration Fortress

Ciconia
Birds of East Asia
Birds described in 1873